Zubaira Alikhanovich Tukhugov (born January 15, 1991) is a Russian mixed martial artist, who fought in the Lightweight division of the Ultimate Fighting Championship (UFC). A professional MMA competitor since 2010, Tukhugov made a name for himself, fighting in promotions like Cage Warriors, ProFC, Fight Nights (EFN) and others, before joining the UFC in 2014.

Mixed martial arts career

Tukhugov made his professional debut in 2010 beating his three opponents by winning Pankration Atrium Cup 2 eight man, one night tournament. After a 10-3 mixed martial arts records, he would be signed by the Russian promotion, Fight Nights, where he won all of his 3 fights, defeating Romano De Los Reyes, Harun Kina and Vaso Bakocevic. During his time on Fight Nights, Tukhugov did a fight for Cage Warriors, defeating Denys Pidnebesnyi at CWFC 58.

Ultimate Fighting Championship
In December 2013, it was announced that Tukhugov had signed a contract with UFC and was scheduled to make his promotional debut against Thiago Tavares on February 15 at UFC Fight Night: Machida vs. Mousasi. However, Tavares was forced to pull out due to an undisclosed injury, and was replaced by UFC newcomer Douglas Silva de Andrade. Tukhugov dominated the fight and got a unanimous decision win.

Tukhugov later faced Ernest Chavez on October 4, at UFC Fight Night: Nelson vs. Story. He won the fight via technical knockout due to punches in the first round.

Tukhugov was expected to face Thiago Tavares on June 6, 2015 at UFC Fight Night 68 However, the pairing was scrapped after Tukhugov suffered a rib injury.

Tukhugov faced Phillipe Nover on December 10, 2015 at UFC Fight Night 80. He won the fight by split decision.

Tukhugov next faced Renato Moicano on May 14, 2016 at UFC 198. In a controversial series of events, despite Tukhogov suffering a kick to the groin in the first round and again in the second round, referee Eduardo Herdy signaled the competitors to continue. Tukhogov lost the fight via split decision.

Tukhugov was expected to face Tiago Trator on December 9, 2016 at UFC Fight Night 102. However, on November 14, Tukhugov was pulled from the card after being notified by USADA of a potential anti-doping violation stemming from an out-of-competition sample collected earlier. In February 2018, it was announced that Tukhugov received a two years USADA suspension and contributed USD ten thousand dollar for the arbitration proceedings in testing positive for ostarine from a sample collected on October 29, 2016.

Tukhugov was scheduled to face Artem Lobov on October 27, 2018 at UFC Fight Night 138. However, it was reported that Tukhugov was removed from the fight due his role in the UFC 229 post-fight melee.

After a three-year lay-off, Tukhugov returned to face Lerone Murphy on September 7, 2019 at UFC 242. The back-and-forth fight ended in a split draw with one judge assigning each fighter a 29-28 win and the third seeing it as a 28-28 draw.

Tukhugov faced Kevin Aguilar on February 23, 2020 at UFC Fight Night 168. He won the fight via TKO in the first round.

Tukhugov faced Hakeem Dawodu on September 27, 2020 at UFC 253. At the weigh-ins, Tukhugov weighed in at 150 pounds, four pounds over the non-title featherweight fight limit. The bout proceeded at a catchweight and Tukhugov was fined a percentage of  his purse, which went to his opponent Dawodu. Tukhugov lost the fight via split decision.

Tukhugov was scheduled to face Ricardo Ramos on March 13, 2021 at UFC Fight Night 187. A week before the event, Tukhugov pulled out due to undisclosed reasons. Promotion officials elected to remove Ramos from the card entirely. The Ramos bout was rescheduled for October 30, 2021 at UFC 267. He won the bout via unanimous decision.

Tukhugov was scheduled to face Nate Landwehr on August 6, 2022 at UFC on ESPN 40, However, Tukhugov pulled out of the fight due to alleged visa issues which restricted his travel.

Tukhugov was scheduled to face Lucas Almeida on October 22, 2022 at UFC 280. The bout was canceled just minutes before weigh-ins, due to weight management issues.

Tukhugov was scheduled to face Joel Álvarez  on February 14, 2023 at UFC 284.  However, Alvarez withrew from the event for undisclosed reasons and he was replace by promotional newcomer Elves Brenner. At the weigh-ins, Tukhugov weighed in at 157.5 pounds, one and a half pound over the lightweight non-title fight limit. The bout proceeded at catchweight and Tukhugov was fined 30% of his purse, which went to Brenner. He lost the fight via split decision.

On February 28, 2023 Tukhugov was released from the UFC roster.

Controversies

UFC 229 Nurmagomedov-McGregor post-fight incident 
At UFC 229, Khabib Nurmagomedov jumped the cage after his victory and charged toward Conor McGregor's team mate Dillon Danis. Soon after,  McGregor and Khabib's cousin Abubakar Nurmagomedov attempted to exit the octagon, but a scuffle broke out between them after McGregor hit Abubakar, who then punched him back. Tukhugov jumped the cage and punched McGregor before security pulled him  and Asadulla Emiragaev away. On January 29, 2019, the NSAC announced a one-year suspension for Tukhugov, (retroactive to October 6, 2018) and a $25,000 fine.  On May 22, 2019, NSAC reduced the  suspensions by 35 days which allowed Tukhugov to be eligible to compete again on September 1, 2019.

Mixed martial arts record

|-
|Loss
|align=center|20–6–1
|Elves Brenner
|Decision (split)
|UFC 284
|
|align=center|3
|align=center|5:00
|Perth, Australia 
|
|-
|Win
|align=center|20–5–1
|Ricardo Ramos 
|Decision (unanimous)
|UFC 267 
|
|align=center|3
|align=center|5:00
|Abu Dhabi, United Arab Emirates
|
|-
|Loss
|align=center|19–5–1
|Hakeem Dawodu
|Decision (split)
|UFC 253 
|
|align=center|3
|align=center|5:00
|Abu Dhabi, United Arab Emirates
| 
|-
|Win
|align=center|19–4–1
|Kevin Aguilar
|TKO (punches)
|UFC Fight Night: Felder vs. Hooker 
|
|align=center|1
|align=center|3:21
|Auckland, New Zealand
|
|-
|Draw
|align=center|
|Lerone Murphy
|Draw (split)
|UFC 242 
|
|align=center|3
|align=center|5:00
|Abu Dhabi, United Arab Emirates
|
|-
|Loss
|align=center|18–4
|Renato Moicano
|Decision (split)
|UFC 198
|
|align=center|3
|align=center|5:00
|Curitiba, Brazil
| 
|-
|Win
|align=center|18–3
|Phillipe Nover
|Decision (split)
|UFC Fight Night: Namajunas vs. VanZant
|
|align=center|3
|align=center|5:00
|Las Vegas, Nevada, United States
|    
|-
|Win
|align=center|17–3
|Ernest Chavez
|TKO (punches)
|UFC Fight Night: Nelson vs. Story
|
|align=center|1
|align=center|4:21
|Stockholm, Sweden
|
|-
|Win
|align=center|16–3
|Douglas Silva de Andrade
|Decision (unanimous)
|UFC Fight Night: Machida vs. Mousasi
|
|align=center|3
|align=center|5:00
|Jaraguá do Sul, Brazil
|
|-
|Win
|align=center|15–3
|Vaso Bakočević
|KO (spinning back kick)
|Fight Nights - Battle of Moscow 13
|
|align=center|1
|align=center|4:30
|Moscow, Russia
|
|-
|Win
|align=center|14–3
|Denys Pidnebesnyi
|Decision (unanimous)
|CWFC 58
|
|align=center|3
|align=center|5:00
|Grozny, Russia
|
|-
|Win
|align=center|13–3
|Kuat Khamitov
|Decision (split)
|Alash Pride - Great Battle
|
|align=center|2
|align=center|5:00
|Almaty, Kazakhstan
|
|-
|Win
|align=center|12–3
|Harun Kina
|TKO (punches)
|Fight Nights - Battle of Moscow 10
|
|align=center|1
|align=center|2:30
|Moscow, Russia
|
|-
|Win
|align=center|11–3
|Romano De Los Reyes
|Decision (unanimous)
|Fight Nights - Battle of Moscow 8
|
|align=center|2
|align=center|5:00
|Moscow, Russia
|
|-
|Win
|align=center|10–3
|Anatoliy Pokrovsky
|Decision (unanimous)
|League S-70: Russian Championship Finals
|
|align=center|1
|align=center|1:43
|Sochi, Russia
|
|-
|Loss
|align=center|9–3
|Akhmet Aliev
|KO (head kick)
|League S-70: Russian Championship SF
|
|align=center|1
|align=center|3:19
|Moscow, Russia
|
|-
|Win
|align=center|9–2
|Ivan Lapin
|Decision (split)
|League S-70: Russian Championship 3rd Round
|
|align=center|3
|align=center|5:00
|Moscow, Russia
|
|-
|Win
|align=center|8–2
|Risim Mislimov
|Decision (unanimous)
|MMA Corona Cup 20
|
|align=center|3
|align=center|5:00
|Moscow, Russia
|
|-
|Loss
|align=center|7–2
|Anton Telepnev
|Decision (split)
|ProFC 22
|
|align=center|3
|align=center|5:00
|Rostov, Russia
|
|-
|Win
|align=center|7–1
|Murad Abdulaev
|TKO (doctor stoppage)
|ProFC - Russia Cup Stage 1
|
|align=center|1
|align=center|5:00
|Taganrog, Russia
|
|-
|Win
|align=center|6–1
|Rasul Shovhalov
|Decision (unanimous)
|ProFC - Russia Cup Stage 1
|
|align=center|2
|align=center|5:00
|Taganrog, Russia
|
|-
|Loss
|align=center|5–1
|Murad Machaev
|Submission (rear-naked choke)
|Fight Nights - Battle of Moscow 1
|
|align=center|1
|align=center|1:17
|Moscow, Russia
|
|-
|Win
|align=center|5–0
|Danil Turinghe
|TKO (punches)
|Fight Nights - Battle of Moscow 1
|
|align=center|1
|align=center|1:26
|Moscow, Russia
|
|-
|Win
|align=center|4–0
|Evgeniy Slonskiy
|Decision (unanimous)
|ProFC - Commonwealth Cup
|
|align=center|2
|align=center|5:00
|Moscow, Russia
|
|-
|Win
|align=center|3–0
|Viktor Finagin
|Submission (rear-naked choke)
|Pankration Atrium Cup 2
|
|align=center|2
|align=center|N/A
|Moscow, Russia
|
|-
|Win
|align=center|2–0
|Roman Markovich
|Decision (unanimous)
|Pankration Atrium Cup 2
|
|align=center|3
|align=center|5:00
|Moscow, Russia
|
|-
|Win
|align=center|1–0
|Isa Musaev
|Decision (unanimous)
|Pankration Atrium Cup 2
|
|align=center|3
|align=center|5:00
|Moscow, Russia
|
|-

See also

 List of male mixed martial artists

References

External links
 
 

1991 births
Lightweight mixed martial artists
Featherweight mixed martial artists
Living people
Russian male mixed martial artists
Chechen sportsmen
Chechen mixed martial artists
Mixed martial artists utilizing sambo
Mixed martial artists utilizing ARB
Sportspeople from Grozny
Russian sportspeople in doping cases
Doping cases in mixed martial arts
Ultimate Fighting Championship male fighters